Stigmella prunifoliella is a moth of the family Nepticulidae. It is found in North America in Pennsylvania, Ohio, New York, Kentucky and Ontario.

The wingspan is 4-4.5 mm.

The larvae feed on Prunus species, including P. serotina, P. pensylvanica and P. nigra. They mine the leaves of their host plant. The mine is much contorted, especially at first, often by confluence forming a blotch, later distinct, with the frass scattered to near the end, where it is collected into a broad line. The leaf of wild cherry is discolored and reddish around the mine. The cocoon is ocherous, sometimes reddish.

External links
Nepticulidae of North America
A taxonomic revision of the North American species of Stigmella (Lepidoptera: Nepticulidae)

Nepticulidae
Moths described in 1861
Moths of North America